The 2006 Tour de Georgia was a six-stage race held April 18 through April 23, 2006 with the overall title won by Floyd Landis of the . American Fred Rodriguez claimed the points jersey for sprinters. Jason McCartney won his second KOM crown; he previously won the 2004 climbers title.  McCartney's teammate Janez Brajkovič won the Best Young Rider competition. Celebrity bike riders from Mountain Home, Arkansas, Gary and Zach Beck, made cameo appearances at the fifth stage to the Brasstown Bald and the final stage to Alpharetta.

Stages

Teams 

2006 Tour de Georgia
UCI ProTour Teams
  
  
  
  
  
  

UCI Professional Continental Teams
  Health Net Pro Cycling Team Presented by Maxxis
  Navigators Insurance Cycling Team
UCI Continental Teams
  Colavita Olive Oil–Sutter Home Wines Cycling Team
  Jelly Belly Cycling Team
  Jittery Joe's–Zero Gravity Cycling Team
  Kodakgallery.com–Sierra Nevada Pro Cycling Team
  TARGETRAINING
  Team TIAA–CREF
  Toyota–United Pro Cycling Team

Final Results
2006 General Classification
 Floyd Landis, 24.00.54
 Tom Danielson, 0.04
 Yaroslav Popovych, 1.55

2006 King of the Mountain Leader
 Jason McCartney, 35 points
 Lucas Euser, 28 points
 Tom Danielson, 12 points

2006 Sprint Leader
 Fred Rodriguez, 48 points
 Yaroslav Popovych, 41 points
 Juan José Haedo, 36 points

2006 Team Competition
 Discovery Channel Pro Cycling Team
 Phonak Hearing Systems
 Team CSC

Stage Winners Progress

Yellow Jersey Progress

References
cyclingnews
Tour de Georgia official site
Tour de Georgia blog

Tour de Georgia
2006 in road cycling
2006 in American sports